Plocama tinctoria is a species of flowering plant in the family Rubiaceae. It is endemic to northern Somalia and the Socotra archipelago of Yemen. Its natural habitat is subtropical or tropical dry forests. It is listed by the IUCN as a threatened species (category Least Concern) under the basionym Gaillonia tinctoria.

References

External links
World Checklist of Rubiaceae

Flora of Socotra
tinctoria
Least concern plants
Flora of Somalia
Taxa named by Isaac Bayley Balfour
Taxobox binomials not recognized by IUCN